The Municipal Property Assessment Corporation (MPAC) administers property assessments and appeals of assessment in the province of Ontario, Canada. MPAC determines the assessed value for all properties across Ontario. This is provided in the form of an Assessment Roll, which is delivered to municipalities throughout the province on the second Tuesday in December. Municipalities then take the assessment roll, and calculate property taxes for each individual property in their jurisdiction. MPAC complains that taxpayers often confuse MPAC's role as an assessment agency for taxes; MPAC responds that it only provides assessments. Municipalities set the tax rates and distribute the tax burden based on the assessed values provided by MPAC.

The head office is located in Pickering, Ontario. MPAC, formerly known as OPAC (Ontario Property Assessment Corporation), was created on December 31, 1997, as a method to create accurate and equitable assessments across Ontario. MPAC came into existence with the MPAC Act, and it administers the Assessment Act, both part of Ontario provincial legislation. On December 31, 1998, the Government of Ontario transferred responsibility for property assessment from the Ministry of Finance to the Ontario Property Assessment Corporation, an independent body established by the Ontario Property Assessment Corporation Act, 1997.

Prior to the creation of MPAC, municipalities in Ontario had discretion on how they chose to assess properties. This created inequity across the province, as similar properties across the province had separate values.

In 2008, MPAC sent out approximately 4.7 million property assessment notices, advising properties of their assessment value. The current values are based on a January 1, 2008, valuation date.

MPAC history

Pre-1970

Although property assessment originally came under the jurisdiction of Upper Canada, it was transferred to Ontario municipalities in 1849. Over time, each municipality developed its own assessment system and methods of valuing property. This resulted in inconsistencies in property assessment and the distribution of property taxes. Within a municipality, properties with a similar appearance and value could have very different assessments. There were also very different assessments from municipality to municipality.

In 1963, the Provincial Government appointed the Ontario Committee on Taxation to study taxation and recommend changes. Its report, published in 1967, highlighted many inequities in the assessment system.

1970-1997 – Market value assessment introduced

In response to The Ontario Committee on Taxation Report, the Provincial Government assumed responsibility for property assessment in 1970 to create a uniform assessment system for all Ontario municipalities. The Government introduced market value assessment and the new system was offered to municipal governments on a voluntary basis.

Since the new system was voluntary, not all municipalities implemented market value assessment. As a result, property assessments differed from municipality to municipality. This situation was addressed by the Province with the introduction of the Fair Municipal Finance Act, 1997. With this Act substantial amendments to the Assessment Act, the Municipal Act and other related legislation were implemented, setting the stage for reshaping Ontario's assessment and property tax system in 1998.

Post-1997 – Ontario Fair Assessment System

Under the "Ontario Fair Assessment System", property assessments across the province were updated to their current value, using a common valuation date.

In addition, on December 31, 1998, responsibility for property assessment was transferred by the government of the Hon. Mr. Mike Harris to a new, not-for-profit corporation called the Ontario Property Assessment Corporation, later renamed the Municipal Property Assessment Corporation (MPAC). Every municipality in Ontario is a member of MPAC, which is governed by a board of directors composed of taxpayer, municipal, and provincial representatives.

Controversy

Persons living in areas where other houses increase in value, such as by replacement with newer and larger houses, often blame MPAC for increases in their taxes. MPAC disclaims responsibility, arguing that the property owners should blame the municipality. The municipalities, in turn, blame MPAC and its organizing legislation. The debate is ongoing.

See also
Crown corporations of Canada

References

External links
Municipal Property Assessment Corporation
About MPAC

Organizations based in Ontario
Crown corporations of Ontario
Canadian taxation government bodies
Property taxes
Local taxation in Canada
Pickering, Ontario